Waimea College is a co-educational secondary school in Richmond, Tasman District, New Zealand. With a growing enrollment of more than 1500 students in grades 9–13, Waimea College is equipped with a park-like campus and numerous facilities.

History
Waimea College was established in 1957.

House system
Waimea College splits students into four houses named after four famous New Zealanders.  They are Rutherford (Green), named after Ernest Rutherford; Sheppard (Blue), named after Kate Sheppard; Hillary (Yellow), named after Edmund Hillary; and Cooper (Red), named after Whina Cooper. Students are involved in various 'House competitions' throughout the year.  These include the annual 'House Sports Day' event, in which students participate in multiple activities throughout the day to win points for their House and 'House Song,' a competition involving each House performing a vocal presentation that is judged and awarded points. At the end of the school year, House points are tallied and the winning House gains the prize of 'House Shield.'

Notable staff
Harold Nelson, athlete

Notable alumni

George Bennett, cyclist
Sir Paul Beresford, British politician
Mike Coman, rugby union player
Craig De Goldi, rugby union player
Rod Dixon, athlete
Mark Douglas, cricketer
Roger Kerr, businessman
Annette King, politician
Dame Suzie Moncrieff, founder of the World of Wearable Art show
Sharon O'Neill, singer–songwriter
Anita Punt, field hockey player 
Jason Richards, motor-racing driver
Kelsey Smith, field hockey player
Rachel Sutherland, field hockey player
David Teece, economist and entrepreneur
Ken Wadsworth, cricketer

References

External links
Official website

Educational institutions established in 1957
Schools in the Tasman District
Secondary schools in New Zealand
1957 establishments in New Zealand
Richmond, New Zealand